The School of Information Technology (SoIT) is the Information Technology Department of Shinawatra University (SIU) located at Pathum Thani province, Thailand. The school aims to provide strong foundations in computer sciences, computer engineerings, and information technologies which are then used to derive practical solutions in the 'real-world' IT problems.

Courses offered 
Bachelor of Science Program in Computer Science
Bachelor of Engineering Program in Computer Engineering
Master of Science Program in Information Technology (International Program)
Doctor of Philosophy Program in Information Technology (International Program)

Computer laboratories 
Macintosh Laboratory
Network and Operating System Laboratory
Computer Architecture Laboratory
Programming and Graphics Design Laboratory

References

University departments in Thailand
2002 establishments in Thailand